The Seventeenth Amendment (Amendment XVII) to the United States Constitution established the direct election of United States senators in each state. The amendment supersedes Article I, Section 3, Clauses 1 and2 of the Constitution, under which senators were elected by state legislatures. It also alters the procedure for filling vacancies in the Senate, allowing for state legislatures to permit their governors to make temporary appointments until a special election can be held.

The amendment was proposed by the 62nd Congress in 1912 and became part of the Constitution on April 8, 1913, on ratification by three-quarters (36) of the state legislatures. Sitting senators were not affected until their existing terms expired. The transition began with two special elections in Georgia and Maryland, then in earnest with the November 1914 election; it was complete on March 4, 1919, when the senators chosen by the November 1918 election took office.

Text

Background

Original composition

Originally, under Article I, Section 3, Clauses 1 and2 of the Constitution, each state legislature elected its state's senators for a six-year term. Each state, regardless of size, is entitled to two senators as part of the Connecticut Compromise between the small and large states. This contrasted with the House of Representatives, a body elected by popular vote, and was described as an uncontroversial decision; at the time, James Wilson was the sole advocate of popularly electing the Senate, but his proposal was defeated 10–1. There were many advantages to the original method of electing senators. Prior to the Constitution, a federal body was one where states effectively formed nothing more than permanent treaties, with citizens retaining their loyalty to their original state. However, under the new Constitution, the federal government was granted substantially more power than before. Having the state legislatures elect the senators reassured anti-federalists that there would be some protection against the federal government's swallowing up states and their powers, and providing a check on the power of the federal government.

Additionally, the longer terms and avoidance of popular election turned the Senate into a body that could counter the populism of the House. While the representatives operated in a two-year direct election cycle, making them frequently accountable to their constituents, the senators could afford to "take a more detached view of issues coming before Congress". State legislatures retained the theoretical right to "instruct" their senators to vote for or against proposals, thus giving the states both direct and indirect representation in the federal government. The Senate was part of a formal bicameralism, with the members of the Senate and House responsible to completely distinct constituencies; this helped defeat the problem of the federal government being subject to "special interests". Members of the Constitutional Convention considered the Senate to be parallel to the British House of Lords as an "upper house", containing the "better men" of society, but improved upon as they would be conscientiously chosen by the upper houses of state legislatures for fixed terms, and not merely inherited for life as in the British system, subject to a monarch's arbitrary expansion. It was hoped they would provide abler deliberation and greater stability than the House of Representatives due to the senators' status.

Issues

According to Judge Jay Bybee of the United States Court of Appeals for the Ninth Circuit, those in favor of popular elections for senators believed two primary problems were caused by the original provisions: legislative corruption and electoral deadlocks. There was a sense that senatorial elections were "bought and sold", changing hands for favors and sums of money rather than because of the competence of the candidate. Between 1857 and 1900, the Senate investigated three elections over corruption. In 1900, for example, William A. Clark had his election voided after the Senate concluded that he had bought votes in the Montana legislature. But conservative analysts Bybee and Todd Zywicki believe this concern was largely unfounded; there was a "dearth of hard information" on the subject. In more than a century of legislative elections of U.S. senators, only ten cases were contested for allegations of impropriety.

Electoral deadlocks were another issue. Because state legislatures were charged with deciding whom to appoint as senators, the system relied on their ability to agree. Some states could not, and thus delayed sending senators to Congress; in a few cases, the system broke down to the point where states completely lacked representation in the Senate. Deadlocks started to become an issue in the 1850s, with a deadlocked Indiana legislature allowing a Senate seat to sit vacant for two years. The tipping point came in 1865 with the election of John P. Stockton (D-NJ), which happened after the New Jersey legislature changed its rules regarding the definition of a quorum and was thus elected by plurality instead of by absolute majority.

In 1866, Congress acted to standardize a two-step process for Senate elections. In the first step, each chamber of the state legislature would meet separately to vote.  The following day, the chambers would meet in "joint assembly" to assess the results, and if a majority in both chambers had voted for the same person, he would be elected.  If not, the joint assembly would vote for a senator, with each member receiving a vote.  If no person received a majority, the joint assembly was required to keep convening every day to take at least one vote until a senator was elected. Nevertheless, between 1891 and 1905, 46 elections were deadlocked across 20 states; in one extreme example, a Senate seat for Delaware went unfilled from 1899 until 1903. The business of holding elections also caused great disruption in the state legislatures, with a full third of the Oregon House of Representatives choosing not to swear the oath of office in 1897 due to a dispute over an open Senate seat. The result was that Oregon's legislature was unable to pass legislation that year.

Zywicki again argues that this was not a serious issue. Deadlocks were a problem, but they were the exception rather than the norm; many legislatures did not deadlock over elections at all. Most of those that did in the 19th century were the newly admitted western states, which suffered from "inexperienced legislatures and weak party discipline... as western legislatures gained experience, deadlocks became less frequent." While Utah suffered from deadlocks in 1897 and 1899, they became what Zywicki refers to as "a good teaching experience", and Utah never again failed to elect senators. Another concern was that when deadlocks occurred, state legislatures were unable to conduct their other normal business; James Christian Ure, writing in the South Texas Law Review, notes that this did not in fact occur. In a deadlock situation, state legislatures would deal with the matter by holding "one vote at the beginning of the day—then the legislators would continue with their normal affairs".

Eventually, legislative elections held in a state's Senate election years were perceived to have become so dominated by the business of picking senators that the state's choice for senator distracted the electorate from all other pertinent issues. Senator John H. Mitchell noted that the Senate became the "vital issue" in all legislative campaigns, with the policy stances and qualifications of state legislative candidates ignored by voters who were more interested in the indirect Senate election. To remedy this, some state legislatures created "advisory elections" that served as de facto general elections, allowing legislative campaigns to focus on local issues.

Calls for reform

Calls for a constitutional amendment regarding Senate elections started in the early 19th century, with Henry R. Storrs in 1826 proposing an amendment to provide for popular election. Similar amendments were introduced in 1829 and 1855, with the "most prominent" proponent being Andrew Johnson, who raised the issue in 1868 and considered the idea's merits "so palpable" that no additional explanation was necessary. As noted above, in the 1860s, there was a major congressional dispute over the issue, with the House and Senate voting to veto the appointment of John P. Stockton to the Senate due to his approval by a plurality of the New Jersey Legislature rather than a majority. In reaction, the Congress passed a bill in July 1866 that required state legislatures to elect senators by an absolute majority.

By the 1890s, support for the introduction of direct election for the Senate had substantially increased, and reformers worked on two fronts. On the first front, the Populist Party incorporated the direct election of senators into its Omaha Platform, adopted in 1892. In 1908, Oregon passed the first law basing the selection of U.S. senators on a popular vote. Oregon was soon followed by Nebraska. Proponents for popular election noted that ten states already had non-binding primaries for Senate candidates, in which the candidates would be voted on by the public, effectively serving as advisory referendums instructing state legislatures how to vote; reformers campaigned for more states to introduce a similar method.

William Randolph Hearst opened a nationwide popular readership for direct election of U.S. senators in a 1906 series of articles using flamboyant language attacking "The Treason of the Senate" in his Cosmopolitan magazine. David Graham Philips, one of the "yellow journalists" whom President Teddy Roosevelt called "muckrakers", described Nelson Aldrich of Rhode Island as the principal "traitor" among the "scurvy lot" in control of the Senate by theft, perjury, and bribes corrupting the state legislatures to gain election to the Senate. A few state legislatures began to petition the Congress for direct election of senators. By 1893, the House had the two-thirds vote for just such an amendment. However, when the joint resolution reached the Senate, it failed from neglect, as it did again in 1900, 1904 and 1908; each time the House approved the appropriate resolution, and each time it died in the Senate.

On the second national legislative front, reformers worked toward a constitutional amendment, which was strongly supported in the House of Representatives but initially opposed by the Senate. Bybee notes that the state legislatures, which would lose power if the reforms went through, were supportive of the campaign. By 1910, 31 state legislatures had passed resolutions calling for a constitutional amendment allowing direct election, and in the same year ten Republican senators who were opposed to reform were forced out of their seats, acting as a "wake-up call to the Senate".

Reformers included William Jennings Bryan, while opponents counted respected figures such as Elihu Root and George Frisbie Hoar among their number; Root cared so strongly about the issue that after the passage of the Seventeenth Amendment he refused to stand for re‑election to the Senate. Bryan and the reformers argued for popular election through highlighting flaws they saw within the existing system, specifically corruption and electoral deadlocks, and through arousing populist sentiment. Most important was the populist argument; that there was a need to "Awaken, in the senators... a more acute sense of responsibility to the people", which it was felt they lacked; election through state legislatures was seen as an anachronism that was out of step with the wishes of the American people, and one that had led to the Senate becoming "a sort of aristocratic body—too far removed from the people, beyond their reach, and with no special interest in their welfare". The settlement of the West and continuing absorption of hundreds of thousands of immigrants expanded the sense of "the people".

Hoar replied that "the people" were both a less permanent and a less trusted body than state legislatures, and moving the responsibility for the election of senators to them would see it passing into the hands of a body that "[lasted] but a day" before changing. Other counterarguments were that renowned senators could not have been elected directly and that, since a large number of senators had experience in the House (which was already directly elected), a constitutional amendment would be pointless. The reform was considered by opponents to threaten the rights and independence of the states, who were "sovereign, entitled... to have a separate branch of Congress... to which they could send their ambassadors." This was countered by the argument that a change in the mode in which senators were elected would not change their responsibilities.

The Senate freshman class of 1910 brought new hope to the reformers. Fourteen of the thirty newly elected senators had been elected through party primaries, which amounted to popular choice in their states. More than half of the states had some form of primary selection for the Senate. The Senate finally joined the House to submit the Seventeenth Amendment to the states for ratification, nearly ninety years after it first was presented to the Senate in 1826.

By 1912, 239 political parties at both the state and national level had pledged some form of direct election, and 33 states had introduced the use of direct primaries. Twenty-seven states had called for a constitutional convention on the subject, with 31 states needed to reach the threshold; Arizona and New Mexico each achieved statehood that year (bringing the total number of states to 48), and were expected to support the motion. Alabama and Wyoming, already states, had passed resolutions in favor of a convention without formally calling for one.

Proposal and ratification

Proposal in Congress

In 1911, the House of Representatives passed House Joint Resolution 39 proposing a constitutional amendment for direct election of senators. The original resolution passed by the House contained the following clause:

This so-called "race rider" clause would have strengthened the powers of states over senatorial elections and weakened those of Congress by overriding Congress's power to override state laws affecting the manner of senatorial elections.

Since the turn of the century, most blacks in the South, and many poor whites, had been disenfranchised by state legislatures passing constitutions with provisions that were discriminatory in practice. This meant that their millions of population had no political representation. Most of the South had one-party states. When the resolution came before the Senate, a substitute resolution, one without the rider, was proposed by Joseph L. Bristow of Kansas. It was adopted by a vote of 64 to 24, with four not voting. Nearly a year later, the House accepted the change. The conference report that would become the Seventeenth Amendment was approved by the Senate in a 42 to 36 vote on April 12, 1912, and by the House 238 to 39, with 110 not voting on May 13, 1912.

Ratification by the states

Having been passed by Congress, the amendment was sent to the states for ratification and was ratified by:
 Massachusetts: May 22, 1912
 Arizona: June 3, 1912
 Minnesota: June 10, 1912
 New York: January 15, 1913
 Kansas: January 17, 1913
 Oregon: January 23, 1913
 North Carolina: January 25, 1913
 California: January 28, 1913
 Michigan: January 28, 1913
 Iowa: January 30, 1913
 Montana: January 30, 1913
 Idaho: January 31, 1913
 West Virginia: February 4, 1913
 Colorado: February 5, 1913
 Nevada: February 6, 1913
 Texas: February 7, 1913
 Washington: February 7, 1913
 Wyoming: February 8, 1913
 Arkansas: February 11, 1913
 Maine: February 11, 1913
 Illinois: February 13, 1913
 North Dakota: February 14, 1913
 Wisconsin: February 18, 1913
 Indiana: February 19, 1913
 New Hampshire: February 19, 1913
 Vermont: February 19, 1913
 South Dakota: February 19, 1913
 Oklahoma: February 24, 1913
 Ohio: February 25, 1913
 Missouri: March 7, 1913
 New Mexico: March 13, 1913
 Nebraska: March 14, 1913
 New Jersey: March 17, 1913
 Tennessee: April 1, 1913
 Pennsylvania: April 2, 1913
 Connecticut: April 8, 1913With 36 states having ratified the Seventeenth Amendment, it was certified by Secretary of State William Jennings Bryan on May 31, 1913, as part of the Constitution. The amendment has subsequently been ratified by:
 Louisiana: June 11, 1914
 Alabama: April 11, 2002
 Delaware: July 1, 2010 (after rejecting the amendment on March 18, 1913)
 Maryland: April 1, 2012
 Rhode Island: June 20, 2014

The Utah legislature rejected the amendment on February 26, 1913. No action on the amendment has been completed by Florida, Georgia, Kentucky, Mississippi, South Carolina, Virginia, Alaska or Hawaii. Alaska and Hawaii were not yet states at the time of the amendment's proposal, and have never taken any official action to support or oppose the amendment since achieving statehood.

Effect

The Seventeenth Amendment altered the process for electing United States senators and changed the way vacancies would be filled. Originally, the Constitution required state legislatures to fill Senate vacancies.

According to Judge Bybee, the Seventeenth Amendment had a dramatic impact on the political composition of the U.S. Senate. Before the Supreme Court required "one man, one vote" in Reynolds v. Sims (1964), malapportionment of state legislatures was common. For example, rural counties and cities could be given "equal weight" in the state legislatures, enabling one rural vote to equal 200 city votes. The malapportioned state legislatures would have given the Republicans control of the Senate in the 1916 Senate elections. With direct election, each vote represented equally, and the Democrats retained control of the Senate.

The reputation of corrupt and arbitrary state legislatures continued to decline as the Senate joined the House of Representatives in implementing popular reforms. Bybee has argued that the amendment led to complete "ignominy" for state legislatures without the buttress of a state-based check on Congress. In the decades following the Seventeenth Amendment, the federal government was enabled to enact progressive measures. However, Schleiches argues that the separation of state legislatures and the Senate had a beneficial effect on the states, as it led state legislative campaigns to focus on local rather than national issues.

New Deal legislation is another example of expanding federal regulation overruling the state legislatures promoting their local state interests in coal, oil, corn and cotton. Ure agrees, saying that not only is each senator now free to ignore his state's interests, senators "have incentive to use their advice-and-consent powers to install Supreme Court justices who are inclined to increase federal power at the expense of state sovereignty". Over the first half of the 20th century, with a popularly elected Senate confirming nominations, both Republican and Democratic, the Supreme Court began to apply the Bill of Rights to the states, overturning state laws whenever they harmed individual state citizens. It aimed to limit the influence of the wealthy.

Filling vacancies
The Seventeenth Amendment requires a governor to call a special election to fill vacancies in the Senate. It also allows a state's legislature to permit its governor to make temporary appointments, which last until a special election is held to fill the vacancy. Currently, all but four states (North Dakota, Oregon, Rhode Island, and Wisconsin) permit such appointments. The Constitution does not set out how the temporary appointee is to be selected.

First direct elections to the Senate
Oklahoma, admitted to statehood in 1907, chose a senator by legislative election three times: twice in 1907, when admitted, and once in 1908. In 1912, Oklahoma reelected Robert Owen by advisory popular vote.

Oregon held primaries in 1908 in which the parties would run candidates for that position, and the state legislature pledged to choose the winner as the new senator.

New Mexico, admitted to statehood in 1912, chose only its first two senators legislatively. Arizona, admitted to statehood in 1912, chose its first two senators by advisory popular vote. Alaska, and Hawaii, admitted to statehood in 1959, have never chosen a U.S. senator legislatively.

The first election subject to the Seventeenth Amendment was a late election in Georgia held June 15, 1913. Augustus Octavius Bacon was however unopposed.

The first direct elections to the Senate following the Seventeenth Amendment being adopted were:
 In Maryland on November 4, 1913: a class 1 special election due to a vacancy, for a term ending in 1917.
 In Alabama on May 11, 1914: a class 3 special election due to a vacancy, for a term ending in 1915.
 Nationwide in 1914: All 32 class 3 senators, term 1915–1921
 Nationwide in 1916: All 32 class 1 senators, term 1917–1923
 Nationwide in 1918: All 32 class 2 senators, term 1919–1925

Court cases and interpretation controversies
In Trinsey v. Pennsylvania (1991), the United States Court of Appeals for the Third Circuit was faced with a situation where, following the death of Senator John Heinz of Pennsylvania, Governor Bob Casey had provided for a replacement and for a special election that did not include a primary. A voter and prospective candidate, John S. Trinsey Jr., argued that the lack of a primary violated the Seventeenth Amendment and his right to vote under the Fourteenth Amendment. The Third Circuit rejected these arguments, ruling that the Seventeenth Amendment does not require primaries.

Another subject of analysis is whether statutes restricting the authority of governors to appoint temporary replacements are constitutional. Vikram Amar, writing in the Hastings Constitutional Law Quarterly, claims Wyoming's requirement that its governor fill a senatorial vacancy by nominating a person of the same party as the person who vacated that seat violates the Seventeenth Amendment. This is based on the text of the Seventeenth Amendment, which states that "the legislature of any state may empower the executive thereof to make temporary appointments". The amendment only empowers the legislature to delegate the authority to the governor and, once that authority has been delegated, does not permit the legislature to intervene. The authority is to decide whether the governor shall have the power to appoint temporary senators, not whom the governor may appoint. Sanford Levinson, in his rebuttal to Amar, argues that rather than engaging in a textual interpretation, those examining the meaning of constitutional provisions should interpret them in the fashion that provides the most benefit, and that legislatures' being able to restrict gubernatorial appointment authority provides a substantial benefit to the states.

Reform and repeal efforts
Notwithstanding controversies over the effects of the Seventeenth Amendment, advocates have emerged to reform or repeal the amendment. Under President Barack Obama's administration in 2009, four sitting Democratic senators left the Senate for executive branch positions: Barack Obama (President), Joe Biden (Vice President), Hillary Clinton (Secretary of State), and Ken Salazar (Secretary of the Interior). Controversies developed about the successor appointments made by Illinois governor Rod Blagojevich and New York governor David Paterson. New interest was aroused in abolishing the provision for the Senate appointment by the governor. Accordingly, Senator Russ Feingold of Wisconsin and Representative David Dreier of California proposed an amendment to remove this power; senators John McCain and Dick Durbin became co-sponsors, as did Representative John Conyers.

Some members of the Tea Party movement argued for repealing the Seventeenth Amendment entirely, claiming it would protect states' rights and reduce the power of the federal government. On March 2, 2016, the Utah legislature approved Senate Joint Resolution No.2 asking Congress to offer an amendment to the United States Constitution that would repeal the Seventeenth Amendment. , no other states had supported such an amendment, and some politicians who had made statements in favor of repealing the amendment had subsequently reversed their position on this.

On July 28, 2017, after senators John McCain, Susan Collins and Lisa Murkowski voted no on the Affordable Care Act repeal attempt Health Care Freedom Act, former Arkansas governor Mike Huckabee endorsed the repeal of the Seventeenth Amendment, claiming that senators chosen by state legislatures will work for their states and respect the Tenth Amendment, and also that direct election of senators is a major cause of the "swamp".

In September 2020, Senator Ben Sasse of Nebraska endorsed the repeal of the Seventeenth Amendment in a Wall Street Journal opinion piece.

Citations

General and cited references 
 
 
 
 
 
 
 
 
 
 
 
 
 
 
 
 
 Wendy J. Schiller and Charles Stewart III (May 2013), The 100th Anniversary of the 17th Amendment: A Promise Unfulfilled?, Issues in Governance Studies, Number 59 May 2013

External links

Seventeenth Amendment to the United States Constitution
1913 in American politics
Amendments to the United States Constitution
Seventeenth
History of voting rights in the United States
Progressive Era in the United States
United States Senate
1912 in American law
1912 in American politics